Placidochromis johnstoni is a species of cichlid native to Lake Malawi, Lake Malombe and the upper reaches of the Shire River where it prefers shallow waters with plentiful vegetation.  This species can reach a length of  TL.  It can also be found in the aquarium trade. The specific name honours the British explorer, botanist, artist, colonial administrator and linguist Sir Henry Hamilton Johnston, better known as Harry Johnston, who collected the type and sent it to the British Museum (Natural History).

References

External links 
 Photograph

johnstoni
Taxa named by Albert Günther
Fish described in 1894
Taxonomy articles created by Polbot